The county of Leicestershire is divided into eight districts: Charnwood, Melton, Harborough, Oadby and Wigston, Blaby, Hinckley and Bosworth, North West Leicestershire, and Leicester. As there are 333 Grade II* listed buildings in the county they have been split into separate lists for each district.

 Grade II* listed buildings in Melton (borough)
 Grade II* listed buildings in Charnwood (borough)
 Grade II* listed buildings in Harborough
 Grade II* listed buildings in Oadby and Wigston
 Grade II* listed buildings in Blaby (district)
 Grade II* listed buildings in Hinckley and Bosworth
 Grade II* listed buildings in North West Leicestershire
 Grade II* listed buildings in Leicester

See also
 Grade I listed buildings in Leicestershire

 
listed buildings